Øyvind or Oyvind may refer to:
Oyvind Aasland (born 1967), Norwegian darts player
Øyvind Alapnes (born 1976), Norwegian football referee
Jon Øyvind Andersen (born 1965), Norwegian black metal guitarist
Carl Øyvind Apeland (born 1964), Norwegian musician plays bass, guitar and keyboard in the Norwegian band Vamp
Øyvind Asbjørnsen (born 1963), Norwegian film producer and director
Øyvind Berg (born 1971), Norwegian ski jumper
Øyvind Berg (lyric poet) (1959–1982), Norwegian lyric poet, playwright, actor and translator
Øyvind Bjørnson (1950–2007), Norwegian historian specialising in labour history and the history of the welfare state
Øyvind Bjorvatn (1931–2015), Norwegian politician for the Liberal Party and later the Liberal People's Party
Øyvind Bolthof (born 1977), Norwegian football goalkeeper
Øyvind Brandtsegg (born 1971), Norwegian musician (percussion, electronica) and programmer
Øyvind S. Bruland (born 1952), Professor of Clinical Oncology, Faculty of Medicine, University of Oslo
Øyvind Dahl (born 1951), retired Norwegian long-distance runner
Øyvind Ellingsen (born 1975), Norwegian cardiologist
Öyvind Fahlström (1928–1976), Swedish Multimedia artist
Øyvind Grøn (born 1944), Norwegian physicist
Øyvind Gram (born 1985), Norwegian football striker
Øyvind Gustavsen (born 1937), Norwegian civil servant
Øyvind Håbrekke (born 1969), Norwegian politician for the Christian Democratic Party
Øyvind Halleraker (born 1951), Norwegian politician representing the Conservative Party
Øyvind Hoås (born 1983), Norwegian football striker
Øyvind Korsberg (born 1960), Norwegian politician for the Progress Party
Øyvind Leonhardsen (born 1970), Norwegian former footballer
Øyvind Mustaparta (born 1979), Norwegian musician (keyboard)
Øyvind Myhre (born 1945), Norwegian author of science fiction and fantasy literature
Øyvind Nordsletten (born 1944), Norwegian diplomat
Øyvind Rauset (born 1952), Norwegian artist, musician and composer
Øyvind Rimbereid (born 1966), Norwegian author and composer of lyric poetry
Øyvind Sandberg (born 1953), Norwegian film director
Øyvind Skaanes (born 1968), former Norwegian cross country skier
Øyvind Slåke (born 1965), Norwegian politician for the Labour Party
Øyvind Staveland (born 1960), founder of the Norwegian band Vamp
Øyvind Stene (born 1947), Norwegian engineer and businessperson
Øyvind Alfred Stensrud (1887–1956), Norwegian politician for the Liberal Party
Øyvind Storflor (born 1979), Norwegian football player
Øyvind Svenning (born 1980), Norwegian football defender
Øyvind Torvund (born 1976), Norwegian composer
Øyvind Tveter (born 1954), former Norwegian speed skater
Øyvind Vaksdal (born 1955), Norwegian politician for the Progress Party

See also 
Eivind
Øivind

Norwegian masculine given names